Lollobrigida may refer to:

People
 Francesca Lollobrigida (born 1991), Italian speed skater
 Francesco Lollobrigida (born 1972), Italian lawyer and politician
 Gina Lollobrigida (1927–2023), Italian actress, photojournalist and sculptress
 Guido Lollobrigida, also known as Lee Burton (1927–2013), Italian actor

Other uses
 Lollobrigida Girls, an electro-pop/synthpop band from Zagreb